Kessleria hauderi is a moth of the family Yponomeutidae and is found in Austria.

The length of the forewings is 8-9.3 mm for males and 6.1-7.1 mm for females. The forewings are a shining whitish brown to whitish grey with some light brown scales. The hindwings are light to dark grey. Adults are on wing from the beginning of July to mid August.

The larvae feed on Saxifraga oppositifolia and possibly Saxifraga caesia. They have a dark green body and black head.

References

Moths described in 1992
Yponomeutidae